Hashem Khan (born April 16, 1941) is a Bangladeshi painter. His paintings mostly focus rural life of Bangladesh. He has important contribution to enrich Bangladeshi art and culture. Hashem Khan participated in Bangladesh liberation war and his many artworks on the war. He is the Chairman of Bangladesh National Museum.

Career
Khan was born in Chandpur district of present-day Bangladesh. He graduated from Faculty of Fine Arts, University of Dhaka in 1961. He was a professor at the Faculty of Fine Arts for 44 years. He retired in 2007.
As he was born and grew up in a village his works reflect the natural beauty of the village, rural life, and many other things. His drawing style is different. He has made significant contribution to the book covers and illustrations.

Exhibitions
 Illustration Show, Tokyo, Japan, 1989
 Bangladesh Shilpakala Academy, Dhaka, 1992
 Bangladesh National Museum, Dhaka, 2000
 Shilpangon Gallery, Dhaka, 2002
Bengal Gallery of Fine Arts, Dhaka, 2005

Awards
 Ekushey Padak (1992)
 Independence Day Award (2011)

Recent Works 
Bharat-Bangladesh Maitri Udyan (India-Bangladesh Friendship Park) 2010

References

1941 births
Living people
Bengali male artists
Bangladeshi painters
University of Dhaka alumni
Academic staff of the University of Dhaka
Recipients of the Ekushey Padak
Recipients of the Independence Day Award